The first elections to the Mizoram Legislative Assembly were held on 8 April 1972 to elect members of the 30 constituencies in Mizoram, India. After the elections, C. Chhunga was appointed as the first Chief Minister of Mizoram.

Mizoram in Northeast India was, in 1972, a newly created Union Territory, after the passing of the North-Eastern Areas (Reorganisation) Act, 1971. It was assigned a Legislative Assembly of 30 members.

Result

Elected Members

See also 
 List of constituencies of the Mizoram Legislative Assembly
 1972 elections in India

References

Mizoram
1972
1972